The 1987–88 NBA season was the 76ers 39th season in the NBA and 25th season in Philadelphia. This was the first season of the post-Julius Erving era, as the team was now led by Charles Barkley. As a result, the Sixers failed to reach the playoffs for the first time since 1975, going 36–46. Matt Goukas was fired in the middle of the season after going 20-23 and was replaced by Jim Lynam.

This was the final season for Andrew Toney, as the former All-Star guard was forced to retire due to foot injuries.

Draft picks

Roster

Regular season

Season standings

z - clinched division title
y - clinched division title
x - clinched playoff spot

Record vs. opponents

Game log

Regular season

|- align="center" bgcolor="#ccffcc"
| 1
| November 6
| Indiana
| W 108–95
|
|
|
| The Spectrum
| 1–0
|- align="center" bgcolor="#ffcccc"
| 2
| November 7
| @ Chicago
| L 94–104
|
|
|
| Chicago Stadium
| 1–1
|- align="center" bgcolor="#ffcccc"
| 3
| November 13, 19877:30 PM EST
| Detroit
| L 94–113
|
|
|
| The Spectrum12,302
| 1–2
|- align="center" bgcolor="#ffcccc"
| 4
| November 14
| @ Atlanta
| L 83–104
|
|
|
| The Omni
| 1–3
|- align="center" bgcolor="#ccffcc"
| 5
| November 18, 19877:30 PM EST
| @ Detroit
| W 113–109
|
|
|
| Pontiac Silverdome17,445
| 2–3
|- align="center" bgcolor="#ccffcc"
| 6
| November 20
| Boston
| W 116–85
|
|
|
| The Spectrum
| 3–3
|- align="center" bgcolor="#ffcccc"
| 7
| November 21
| @ Cleveland
| L 88–101
|
|
|
| Richfield Coliseum
| 3–4
|- align="center" bgcolor="#ccffcc"
| 8
| November 24
| Cleveland
| W 108–104
|
|
|
| The Spectrum
| 4–4
|- align="center" bgcolor="#ffcccc"
| 9
| November 27
| @ Golden State
| L 103–109
|
|
|
| Oakland–Alameda County Coliseum Arena
| 4–5
|- align="center" bgcolor="#ffcccc"
| 10
| November 28
| @ Sacramento
| L 114–115 (OT)
|
|
|
| ARCO Arena
| 4–6
|- align="center" bgcolor="#ccffcc"
| 11
| November 30
| @ Utah
| W 106–100
|
|
|
| Salt Palace Acord Arena
| 5–6

|- align="center" bgcolor="#ffcccc"
| 12
| December 2
| @ L.A. Clippers
| L 85–88
|
|
|
| Los Angeles Memorial Sports Arena
| 5–7
|- align="center" bgcolor="#ccffcc"
| 13
| December 4
| Seattle
| W 118–105
|
|
|
| The Spectrum
| 6–7
|- align="center" bgcolor="#ccffcc"
| 14
| December 8
| @ Chicago
| W 109–96
|
|
|
| Chicago Stadium
| 7–7
|- align="center" bgcolor="#ccffcc"
| 15
| December 9
| Portland
| W 94–86
|
|
|
| The Spectrum
| 8–7
|- align="center" bgcolor="#ffcccc"
| 16
| December 12
| Denver
| L 121–131
|
|
|
| The Spectrum
| 8–8
|- align="center" bgcolor="#ccffcc"
| 17
| December 16
| San Antonio
| W 114–102
|
|
|
| The Spectrum
| 9–8
|- align="center" bgcolor="#ccffcc"
| 18
| December 17
| @ New York
| W 110–106
|
|
|
| Madison Square Garden
| 10–8
|- align="center" bgcolor="#ccffcc"
| 19
| December 19
| Dallas
| W 95–90
|
|
|
| The Spectrum
| 11–9
|- align="center" bgcolor="#ffcccc"
| 20
| December 20
| @ Boston
| L 87–124
|
|
|
| Boston Garden
| 11–9
|- align="center" bgcolor="#ffcccc"
| 21
| December 22
| Boston
| L 115–118
|
|
|
| The Spectrum
| 11–10
|- align="center" bgcolor="#ccffcc"
| 22
| December 23
| @ New Jersey
| W 110–106
|
|
|
| Brendan Byrne Arena
| 12–10
|- align="center" bgcolor="#ffcccc"
| 23
| December 25
| Atlanta
| L 100–106
|
|
|
| The Spectrum
| 12–11
|- align="center" bgcolor="#ffcccc"
| 24
| December 28
| @ Phoenix
| L 101–117
|
|
|
| Arizona Veterans Memorial Coliseum
| 12–12
|- align="center" bgcolor="#ffcccc"
| 25
| December 29, 198710:30 PM EST
| @ L.A. Lakers
| L 115–131
|
|
|
| The Forum17,505
| 12–13

|- align="center" bgcolor="#ffcccc"
| 26
| January 1
| @ Portland
| L 114–116
|
|
|
| Memorial Coliseum
| 12–14
|- align="center" bgcolor="#ffcccc"
| 27
| January 2
| @ Seattle
| L 114–116
|
|
|
| Seattle Center Coliseum
| 12–15
|- align="center" bgcolor="#ccffcc"
| 28
| January 4
| Phoenix
| W 122–114
|
|
|
| The Spectrum
| 13–15
|- align="center" bgcolor="#ccffcc"
| 29
| January 6
| Utah
| W 116–93
|
|
|
| The Spectrum
| 14–15
|- align="center" bgcolor="#ccffcc"
| 30
| January 8
| L.A. Clippers
| W 117–103
|
|
|
| The Spectrum
| 15–15
|- align="center" bgcolor="#ccffcc"
| 31
| January 9
| Cleveland
| W 126–110
|
|
|
| The Spectrum
| 16–15
|- align="center" bgcolor="#ffcccc"
| 32
| January 12
| @ Milwaukee
| L 103–106
|
|
|
| MECCA Arena
| 16–16
|- align="center" bgcolor="#ccffcc"
| 33
| January 13
| New Jersey
| W 104–95
|
|
|
| The Spectrum
| 17–16
|- align="center" bgcolor="#ccffcc"
| 34
| January 15
| New York
| W 119–104
|
|
|
| The Spectrum
| 18–16
|- align="center" bgcolor="#ffcccc"
| 35
| January 16
| @ New York
| L 96–110
|
|
|
| Madison Square Garden
| 18–17
|- align="center" bgcolor="#ffcccc"
| 36
| January 20
| Washington
| L 98–110
|
|
|
| The Spectrum
| 18–18
|- align="center" bgcolor="#ffcccc"
| 37
| January 24
| @ Washington
| L 99–131
|
|
|
| Capital Centre
| 18–19
|- align="center" bgcolor="#ffcccc"
| 38
| January 25
| @ Washington
| L 117–118 (OT)
|
|
|
| Capital Centre
| 18–20
|- align="center" bgcolor="#ffcccc"
| 39
| January 27
| Chicago
| L 109–119 (OT)
|
|
|
| The Spectrum
| 18–21
|- align="center" bgcolor="#ccffcc"
| 40
| January 29
| Indiana
| W 94–89
|
|
|
| The Spectrum
| 19–21
|- align="center" bgcolor="#ffcccc"
| 41
| January 31
| @ Boston
| L 85–100
|
|
|
| Boston Garden
| 19–22

|- align="center" bgcolor="#ccffcc"
| 42
| February 3
| Golden State
| W 96–84
|
|
|
| The Spectrum
| 20–22
|- align="center" bgcolor="#ffcccc"
| 43
| February 4
| @ Indiana
| L 95–109
|
|
|
| Market Square Arena
| 20–23
|- align="center" bgcolor="#ffcccc"
| 44
| February 9
| @ Atlanta
| L 110–112
|
|
|
| The Omni
| 20–24
|- align="center" bgcolor="#ccffcc"
| 45
| February 11
| Milwaukee
| W 119–113 (OT)
|
|
|
| The Spectrum
| 21–24
|- align="center" bgcolor="#ffcccc"
| 46
| February 14
| @ New Jersey
| L 105–109
|
|
|
| Brendan Byrne Arena
| 21–25
|- align="center" bgcolor="#ffcccc"
| 47
| February 15, 19887:30 PM EST
| @ Detroit
| L 95–102
|
|
|
| Pontiac Silverdome21,530
| 21–26
|- align="center" bgcolor="#ffcccc"
| 48
| February 17
| Cleveland
| L 107–115
|
|
|
| The Spectrum
| 21–27
|- align="center" bgcolor="#ccffcc"
| 49
| February 19
| New Jersey
| W 115–100
|
|
|
| The Spectrum
| 22–27
|- align="center" bgcolor="#ffcccc"
| 50
| February 21
| @ Milwaukee
| L 115–120 (OT)
|
|
|
| MECCA Arena
| 22–28
|- align="center" bgcolor="#ffcccc"
| 51
| February 22
| @ Houston
| L 106–119
|
|
|
| The Summit
| 22–29
|- align="center" bgcolor="#ffcccc"
| 52
| February 24
| @ San Antonio
| L 121–123 (OT)
|
|
|
| HemisFair Arena
| 22–30
|- align="center" bgcolor="#ffcccc"
| 53
| February 26
| @ Denver
| L 104–120
|
|
|
| McNichols Sports Arena
| 22–31
|- align="center" bgcolor="#ffcccc"
| 54
| February 27
| @ Dallas
| L 91–100
|
|
|
| Reunion Arena
| 22–32
|- align="center" bgcolor="#ccffcc"
| 55
| February 29
| Chicago
| W 102–101
|
|
|
| The Spectrum
| 23–32

|- align="center" bgcolor="#ffcccc"
| 56
| March 3
| @ Chicago
| L 93–97
|
|
|
| Chicago Stadium
| 23–33
|- align="center" bgcolor="#ffcccc"
| 57
| March 4
| @ New York
| L 108–110 (OT)
|
|
|
| Madison Square Garden
| 23–34
|- align="center" bgcolor="#ccffcc"
| 58
| March 6
| @ Indiana
| W 105–100
|
|
|
| Market Square Arena
| 24–34
|- align="center" bgcolor="#ffcccc"
| 59
| March 7, 19887:30 PM EST
| L.A. Lakers
| L 104–110
|
|
|
| The Spectrum18,168
| 24–35
|- align="center" bgcolor="#ccffcc"
| 60
| March 11
| Sacramento
| W 124–118
|
|
|
| The Spectrum
| 25–35
|- align="center" bgcolor="#ccffcc"
| 61
| March 13
| Washington
| W 104–96
|
|
|
| The Spectrum
| 26–35
|- align="center" bgcolor="#ffcccc"
| 62
| March 15
| @ Atlanta
| L 90–104
|
|
|
| The Omni
| 26–36
|- align="center" bgcolor="#ccffcc"
| 63
| March 16
| New York
| W 115–108
|
|
|
| The Spectrum
| 27–36
|- align="center" bgcolor="#ccffcc"
| 64
| March 18
| Indiana
| W 129–109
|
|
|
| The Spectrum
| 28–36
|- align="center" bgcolor="#ccffcc"
| 65
| March 19
| @ Washington
| W 94–89
|
|
|
| Capital Centre
| 29–36
|- align="center" bgcolor="#ffcccc"
| 66
| March 22
| @ New Jersey
| L 90–102
|
|
|
| Brendan Byrne Arena
| 29–37
|- align="center" bgcolor="#ffcccc"
| 67
| March 23
| Chicago
| L 102–118
|
|
|
| The Spectrum
| 29–38
|- align="center" bgcolor="#ccffcc"
| 68
| March 25
| @ Boston
| W 97–93
|
|
|
| Boston Garden
| 30–38
|- align="center" bgcolor="#ccffcc"
| 69
| March 28
| Houston
| W 108–98
|
|
|
| The Spectrum
| 31–38
|- align="center" bgcolor="#ccffcc"
| 70
| March 30
| Milwaukee
| W 134–109
|
|
|
| The Spectrum
| 32–38

|- align="center" bgcolor="#ffcccc"
| 71
| April 1
| Atlanta
| L 93–105
|
|
|
| The Spectrum
| 32–39
|- align="center" bgcolor="#ffcccc"
| 72
| April 5
| New York
| L 119–136
|
|
|
| The Spectrum
| 32–40
|- align="center" bgcolor="#ffcccc"
| 73
| April 8, 19887:30 PM EDT
| Detroit
| L 86–96
|
|
|
| The Spectrum15,164
| 32–41
|- align="center" bgcolor="#ffcccc"
| 74
| April 10
| Boston
| L 108–117
|
|
|
| The Spectrum
| 32–42
|- align="center" bgcolor="#ccffcc"
| 75
| April 11
| @ Milwaukee
| W 115–102
|
|
|
| MECCA Arena
| 33–42
|- align="center" bgcolor="#ccffcc"
| 76
| April 13
| Washington
| W 98–97 (OT)
|
|
|
| The Spectrum
| 34–42
|- align="center" bgcolor="#ffcccc"
| 77
| April 15
| Atlanta
| L 101–103 (OT)
|
|
|
| The Spectrum
| 34–43
|- align="center" bgcolor="#ffcccc"
| 78
| April 16
| @ Indiana
| L 92–126
|
|
|
| Market Square Arena
| 34–44
|- align="center" bgcolor="#ccffcc"
| 79
| April 19
| Milwaukee
| W 115–102
|
|
|
| The Spectrum
| 35–44
|- align="center" bgcolor="#ccffcc"
| 80
| April 21
| New Jersey
| W 104–101
|
|
|
| The Spectrum
| 36–44
|- align="center" bgcolor="#ffcccc"
| 81
| April 23
| @ Cleveland
| L 99–104
|
|
|
| Richfield Coliseum
| 36–45
|- align="center" bgcolor="#ffcccc"
| 82
| April 24, 19887:00 PM EDT
| @ Detroit
| L 118–128
|
|
|
| Pontiac Silverdome27,854
| 36–46

Player statistics

Awards and records
 Charles Barkley, All-NBA First Team

Transactions

References

See also
 1987-88 NBA season

Philadelphia 76ers seasons
Philadelphia
Philadelphia
Philadelphia